Prince Gustaf Adolf Sea formerly Prince Gustav Adolf Sea is a marginal sea of the Arctic Ocean located in the Qikiqtaaluk Region, Nunavut, and the Inuvik Region, Canada.

Geography
It is situated among the islands of the Arctic Archipelago. The sea is bounded on the west by Borden Island and Mackenzie King Island, and on the east by Ellef Ringnes Island. To the south is Lougheed Island. The sea opens into the Arctic Ocean to the north, and into the Byam Martin Channel and Maclean Strait to the south.

The Sea was named in 1898 by Otto Sverdrup after the Swedish prince (and later king) Gustav VI Adolf.

See also
 List of seas

References

Bodies of water of Qikiqtaaluk Region
Marginal seas of the Arctic Ocean
Bodies of water of the Northwest Territories
Inuvik Region